Alan Aldridge (8 July 1938 – 17 February 2017) was a British artist, graphic designer and illustrator. He is best known for his psychedelic artwork made for books and record covers by The Beatles and The Who.

Personal life

Aldridge was born in North London and lived in Los Angeles, California. He is survived by 8 children: fashion photographer Miles Aldridge, model and social activist Saffron Aldridge and Marc from his first marriage to Rita Farthing; two sons, Pim and Toby, from a relationship with Andrea Gayler; and two daughters, models Lily Aldridge and Ruby Aldridge, and a son, James, from his second marriage to Laura Lyons, which also ended in divorce. He has 11 grandchildren. On 17 February 2017, his daughter Lily announced his death via Instagram.

Career

Aldridge first worked as an illustrator at The Sunday Times Magazine. After doing some freelance book covers for Penguin Books, he was hired in March 1965 by Penguin's chief editor Tony Godwin to become the art director of Penguin. Over the next two years as art director, he especially focused on science fiction book covers and introduced his style which resonated with the mood of the time. In 1968 he moved to his own graphic-design firm, INK, which became closely involved with graphic images for the Beatles and Apple Corps.

During the 1960s and 1970s, he was responsible for a great many album covers, and helped create the graphic style of that era. He designed a series of science fiction book covers for Penguin Books. He made a big impression with his illustrations for the book The Beatles Illustrated Lyrics. He also provided illustrations for The Penguin Book of Comics, a history of British and American comic art. His work was characterised by a flowing, cartoony style and soft airbrushing – very much in step with the psychedelic styles of the times. His work includes the 1971 anti-war poster entitled A great place for hamburgers but who'd want to live there!

In the theatre, in February 1969 he designed the graphics for the controversial Jane Arden play Vagina Rex and the Gas Oven at the London Arts Laboratory, Drury Lane.

He is possibly best known, however, for the picture book The Butterfly Ball and the Grasshopper Feast (1973), a series of illustrations of anthropomorphic insects and other creatures, which he created in collaboration with Harry Willock. William Plomer wrote the accompanying verses. This was based on William Roscoe's poem of the same name, but was inspired when Aldridge read that John Tenniel had told Lewis Carroll it was impossible to draw a wasp in a wig.

Aldridge also created the artwork for Captain Fantastic and the Brown Dirt Cowboy by Elton John in 1975. In 1977 he created an advertisement illustration for the Dutch beer brand Heineken. He was also the creator of the Hard Rock Café logo.

Honours and awards

A retrospective Alan Aldridge – the Man with the Kaleidoscope Eyes featured at the Design Museum in London from 10 October 2008 to 25 January 2009, and was reviewed as "The trip of a lifetime".

Over the years Aldridge won many awards for his work, among them Whitbread Children's Book Award (1973).

Selected works

Cover for Boswell's London Journal 1762–1763, ed. Frederick Pottle, Penguin (1966).
Cover design for A Quick One by The Who (1966).
Poster for Andy Warhol and Paul Morrissey's film Chelsea Girls (1966).
Covers for Penguin Science Fiction books (1967).
The Beatles Illustrated Lyrics (US, Houghton Mifflin; UK, MacDonald Unit 75, 1969) editor, select illustrations.
Ann in the Moon (1970), with story by Frances D. Francis.
The Penguin Book of Comics (1971), with George Perry, published by Penguin Books.
The Ship's Cat (1977), illustrated in collaboration with Harry Willock, with verses by Richard Adams.
The Peacock Party (1979) and The Lion's Cavalcade (1980), sequels to The Butterfly Ball, based on anonymous sequels to Roscoe's version with verses by George E. Ryder and Ted Walker respectively. Illustrated in collaboration with Harry Willock.
Phantasia: Of Docklands, Rocklands and Dodos (1981)
The Gnole (1999), with Steve Boyett (writer) and Maxine Miller (colorist).
 Illustrations and logo design for Everybody Loves a Happy Ending, the sixth studio album by British pop rock/new wave band Tears for Fears, 2004.
 Aldridge is also credited for Art Direction and Illustration on Light Grenades (2006), the sixth studio album for Incubus.

 
 The Man with Kaleidoscope Eyes (Thames & Hudson, 2008), 240 pp, ; also published as The Man with Kaleidoscope Eyes: The Art of Alan Aldridge (Abrams Books, 2009), 240 pp,

References

External links
 
Picture of Alan Aldridge @ The Design Museum

Alan Aldridge's science fiction covers for Penguin Books.
Alan Aldridge agent website
 . Alan Aldridge is one of six people interviewed during the 29-minute BBC2 program.
 
 

1943 births
2017 deaths
English illustrators
English graphic designers
Artists from London
Album-cover and concert-poster artists
Advertising artists and illustrators
English expatriates in the United States
Penguin Books people
Science fiction artists